Calvin Coolidge Ermer (November 10, 1923 – August 8, 2009) was an American second baseman, manager, coach and scout in Major League Baseball. He was born in Baltimore, Maryland, the youngest of seven children, attended Patterson High School, and served in the United States Marine Corps during World War II.

Longtime employee of Senators and Twins
Ermer played in the minor leagues from 1942 to 1951, losing three seasons (1943–1945) to wartime military service. Most of Ermer's 60-plus-year career in baseball was spent as an employee of the Minnesota Twins and its predecessor franchise (before 1961), the Washington Senators. His only major league game as a player, on September 26, 1947, came with Washington; he was hitless in three at bats against Bill McCahan of the Philadelphia Athletics at Griffith Stadium, and handled seven fielding chances flawlessly as a second baseman. Washington won the game, 4–3.

Ermer also played and managed in the club's farm system, handling Senators/Twins farm clubs over five different decades, beginning with the Charlotte Hornets in 1947 and ending with the Toledo Mud Hens in 1985. He also served as a skipper in the minor league systems of the Pittsburgh Pirates and New York Yankees, and in 1958 won The Sporting News Minor League Manager of the Year award while with the Birmingham Barons, then a farm team of the Detroit Tigers. His minor league teams won championships in 1947 and 1958.

Major league manager
On June 9, 1967, Ermer was promoted from the Twins' Triple-A affiliate, the Denver Bears of the Pacific Coast League, to replace Minnesota manager Sam Mele. Under Ermer, the Twins won 66 of 112 games and jumped into a four-team American League pennant race (with the Tigers, Boston Red Sox and Chicago White Sox) that went down to the season's final weekend. Needing only one win in two games at Boston's Fenway Park to clinch a tie for the championship, the Twins lost both contests to the Red Sox, who became improbable league champions.

Ermer was brought back for 1968, but a big off-season trade with the Los Angeles Dodgers backfired, Baseball Hall of Fame slugger Harmon Killebrew suffered a serious hamstring injury during the 1968 Major League Baseball All-Star Game, nearly ending his career, and the Twins tumbled to 79–83 and a seventh-place finish. At season's end, Ermer was fired and replaced by his former coach Billy Martin. It was Martin's first big-league managing assignment.

Late career
The Twins' job (his final record: 145–129, .529) was his only Major League managerial opportunity, but Ermer also served as an MLB coach for the Baltimore Orioles (1962), Milwaukee Brewers (1970–1972) and Oakland Athletics (1977). He ultimately returned to the Twins to manage their Triple-A farm club, then the Toledo Mud Hens, from 1978–1985 before spending many years as a Minnesota scout. As a minor league pilot, Ermer won 1,906 games, losing 1,728 (.524) over 26 seasons.

Cal Ermer died at age 85 in Chattanooga, Tennessee, on August 8, 2009. Almost a year before, on August 30, 2008, the Chattanooga Lookouts (which he managed from 1952–1857 and led to the 1952 Southern Association pennant) dedicated their press box to Ermer. He had met and married Gloria Williams (Miss Chattanooga and Miss Tennessee of 1952) and had two sons, David and Michael. He lived in Chattanooga for 57 years. Ermer was also soccer coach for the University of Baltimore and managed baseball teams in the winter leagues. He was buried in Chattanooga's National Cemetery.

References

External links

Chattanooga Lookouts history page featuring images of Cal

1923 births
2009 deaths
Baltimore Orioles coaches
Baltimore Orioles scouts
Baseball coaches from Maryland
Baseball players from Baltimore
Birmingham Barons managers
Burlington Bees players
Charlotte Hornets (baseball) players
Chattanooga Lookouts managers
Hagerstown Owls players
Jacksonville Tars players
Major League Baseball third base coaches
Milwaukee Brewers coaches
Milwaukee Brewers scouts
Minnesota Twins managers
Minnesota Twins scouts
Oakland Athletics coaches
Orlando Senators players
Sportspeople from Chattanooga, Tennessee
Savannah Indians players
Toledo Mud Hens managers
United States Marine Corps personnel of World War II
Washington Senators (1901–1960) players
Orlando Nationals players